Metal Edge was a magazine covering heavy metal music published by Zenbu Media. The magazine was founded in the summer of 1985, during the height of glam metal's success. Zenbu Media acquired Metal Edge in February 2007.

Both Metal Edge and its sister publication, Metal Maniacs, ceased operations in 2009.

While its sister publication, Metal Maniacs focused more on extreme subgenres of heavy metal such as thrash metal and death metal, Metal Edge focused more on glam metal and traditional heavy metal

In March 2019, posts and a new logo were made to the Metal Edge Facebook page, indicating that the magazine may be making a return in the near future. According to the page, the magazine is owned by To11 Media as of 2019

References

Music magazines published in the United States
Defunct magazines published in the United States
Heavy metal publications
Magazines established in 1985
Magazines disestablished in 2009
1985 establishments in the United States

Project M Group brands